The Observatoire de l’Espace (Space Observatory)  is a cultural laboratory created in 2000 by CNES (the French Space Agency) to promote a new vision of outer space, different from that of popular science. Space has a major influence on people's perceptions and imagination. The Observatoire de l’Espace introduces artists to the activities of the CNES and paves the way for any kind of space-inspired creations. Those creations strongly connected to space art are thereafter shared with the wider audience.

Programs

As a cultural laboratory, the Observatoire de l’Espace has a specific methodology: the goal is to share space-related items and innovations with artists, in order to inspire new creations. Two programmes have been developed following this process.

Cultural studies of Space Program
 
For many years, the Observatoire de l’Espace has been developing a cultural story of outer space by building an inventory of everything created on Earth about outer space. It resulted in a wide classification: space instruments (for example satellite prototypes), audio and video items (documentaries, video archives...), works of art inspired by outer space, laboratories and other space related buildings, and all kinds of everyday life objects.
 
The Observatoire de l’Espace is also welcoming researchers in human sciences and art history as well as building partnerships with research laboratories to foster works about Space in those fields.
 
An academic blog called Humanités spatiales (Space humanities) was also created in 2015. This website is dedicated to analysis and dialogue for researchers who are interested in space activities and its cultural representations. All this work can be used by artists as a basis for new creations.

The Spatial Creation and Imagination Program

The Observatoire de l’Espace fosters space-related artistic creation through its programme called "Création et Imaginaire spatial" (Spatial creation and imagination) which enables artists to benefit from an off-site residency. Various immersive ways to discover the space field are suggested to the artists: interviews with space experts, scientific data and documentation, access to places where spatial activities take place (laboratories, technical or industrial centers...), participation in scientists seminaries or even weightlessness flights aboard the Airbus Zero-G. Many creations arise from this programme: from literature to contemporary art and from performing arts to contemporary music. Many cultural events are organized by the Observatoire de l’Espace in order to present those creations but they are also displayed in many cultural places
.

Events

Sideration festival

The Sideration festival takes place every year in March at the CNES’ headquarters in Paris. Since 2011, it enables a deep immersion in Space and imagination through an eclectic programme: theatre, music, video, cinema, visual arts, readings and even real or fictional science stories. Every year, the CNES’ headquarters become a large art-science stage where about 30 artists have the opportunity to exhibit their space related productions. Those creations are often the result of a strong collaboration with the artists through the « off-site » residency programme, the sharing of studies about space or through calls for submissions regarding the journal Espace(s).

Nuit Blanche (All-nighter)

One opportunity for the Observatoire de l’Espace to organize an exhibition is for the Nuit Blanche which is an annual all night long, cultural, free arts festival. Since 2014, the Observatoire de l’Espace has called for artistic projects dealing with Space history. Selected archives are given to artists in order to widen their imagination or to be the core material of their creations. Archives and creations are both exhibited during the Nuit Blanche at the CNES’ headquarter.

The journal Espace(s)

The journal Espace(s) is an semi-annual journal dedicated to literature and a large variety of creations (typography, performing arts, comic strip, music, poetry...). It gathers texts dealing with a chosen theme linked with Space (Dreams, revolt, revolution, or Obsession and fascination). About thirty authors contribute to each issue. This collection is written under the format of laboratory books in order to mix up both literary and scientific universes. The works of the Spatial creation and imagination programme, made by the artists in residency, also have their place in the journal.

References 

CNES
Space art